Terrible Mountain or Mount Terrible may refer to:

 Terrible Mountain (Colorado)
 Terrible Mountain (Vermont)
 Mount Terrible (New South Wales), a mountain within the Great Dividing Range, in the Snowy Mountains region of New South Wales, Australia
 Mount Terrible (Victoria), a mountain within the Great Dividing Range, Victoria, Australia

See also
 Mont Terri, Switzerland, known as Mont Terrible during Napoleonic times
 Mont-Terrible, a department of Napoleonic France, named after the mountain